Fotini Dekazou Stefanopoulou (died 7 October 2021) was a Greek academic and politician. A member of the Political Spring party, she served in the Hellenic Parliament from 1993 to 1996.

References

2021 deaths
Greek politicians
Greek MPs 1993–1996
Politicians from Athens
Women members of the Hellenic Parliament
Political Spring politicians